BEREC may refer to:

 British Ever Ready Electrical Company, a consumer battery manufacturer that traded under the "BEREC" and "Ever Ready" names
 Body of European Regulators for Electronic Communications